Dipipanone (Pipadone) is a strong opioid analgesic drug, used for acute pain by mouth (PO) for adults - initially 10 mg every 6 hours, then increased if necessary up to 30 mg every 6 hours, with the dose to be increased gradually. It is often used in instances where morphine is indicated but cannot be used due to the patient being allergic to morphine. In analgesic potency 25 mg dipipanone is
approximately equivalent to 10 mg morphine.

Dosage forms

The main preparation of the drug commercially available is mixed with cyclizine (Diconal, Wellconal) which has the advantage of reducing nausea, vomiting and histamine release associated with strong opioid therapy.

Dipipanone was also available as an oral mixture 10 mg/5ml without the cyclizine during the 1970s–1980s in the United Kingdom. This form was rare and used normally only in drug trials and in specialist Diconal addiction clinics. 

Dipipanone is now the only alternative opioid left to use in the UK that is of equal strength to morphine that can be prescribed instead, aside from oxycodone and hydromorphone which are typically the second and third-line alternative to pain relief when morphine is indicated but not tolerated. A fentanyl patch may also be used, especially in cases of renal impairment.

One of the limitations of using dipipanone is that it is only produced in one dosage form that is mixed with the anti-emetic and anti-histamine cyclizine at a ratio of 25% dipipanone to 75% cyclizine which limits the dose of dipipanone to an absolute maximum of 3 tablets per dose up to 4-6 times a day. This is a 10mg Dipipanone/30mg cyclizine formulation.  It is made by the following manufacturers:

Dipipanone 10mg / Cyclizine 30mg tablets (Phoenix Healthcare Distribution Ltd)

Dipipanone 10mg / Cyclizine 30mg tablets (Alliance Healthcare (Distribution) Ltd)

Dipipanone 10mg / Cyclizine 30mg tablets (Advanz Pharma)

All formulations contain the same dose.

As of November 2011 Amdipharm stopped making the Diconal brand tablets for the UK due to undisclosed commercial reasons. However the product is listed as available on the manufacturer's website as of July 1, 2014. General practitioners are now advised to prescribe it as generic dipipanone/cyclizine tablets.

Use
Dipipanone is now unavailable in most countries of the world either by laws prohibiting its medicinal use as in the United States or by falling out of production as more modern analgesics took its market share. Great Britain, Northern Ireland and South Africa are known to continue to use the substance but it is infrequently prescribed.

Dipipanone is a Schedule I controlled substance in the United States; it has been assigned the ACSCN of 9622 and since 2013 had an annual manufacturing quota of 5 grams.

Chemistry
Chemically, dipipanone belongs to the class of opioids called the 4,4-diphenylheptane-3-ones. It closely resembles methadone, the only structural difference being the N,N-dimethyl moiety of methadone being replaced with a piperidine ring. Other related compounds with equivalent activity where the piperidine ring has been replaced by other groups, include the morpholine derivative phenadoxone, as well as the corresponding pyrrolidine derivative dipyanone. The synthesis is the same as for phenadoxone, with the exception that piperidine is used in lieu of morpholine. Related compounds with an isoquinuclidine ring such as nufenoxole are also known.

Medical and recreational use
Prescription of dipipanone is discouraged apart from in exceptional circumstances, because of the perceived risk of abuse - the BNF marks the substance as "less suitable for prescribing" along with other older compounds such as pethidine and pentazocine with unusual abuse patterns. The combination with cyclizine leads to a very strong "rush" if the drug is injected, however the tablets contain insoluble binders which led to many limb amputations and some fatalities (as with temazepam). During the late 1970s to early 1980s in the UK, many deaths were blamed on misuse of this preparation.  As supplies became unavailable, opiate users would mix crushed methadone tablets or  ampoules with crushed  cyclizine  tablets, in an attempt to replicate the effect of Diconal. When taken orally as indicated for pain, the risk of addiction and euphoric potential is similar to that of morphine, however the historical intravenous use may cause apprehension for prescribing doctors.

References 

Analgesics
Ketones
Mu-opioid receptor agonists
1-Piperidinyl compounds
Synthetic opioids
Benzhydryl compounds